Gunny is the nickname of a United States Marine Corps gunnery sergeant. It is also the nickname of:
Soldiers and fictional characters with the nickname based on their military rank are excluded, as they are too numerous.
 Gonville Bromhead (1845–1891), British Army officer awarded the Victoria Cross
 Gunny Bush (born 1974), American murderer awaiting execution
 Thomas Harboe, American architect who restored the Marquette Building and the Chicago Board of Trade Building
 Gunnhildur Yrsa Jónsdóttir (born 1988), Icelandic female footballer
 Chain pickerel, a species of freshwater fish

See also
 Günny Kruse, a former member of the German band Paragon (2003–2009)
 Gunnie, a Royal Australian Air Force term for a type of armourer or aircraft technician
 Gunnies, a mining term with several meanings

Lists of people by nickname